Mohamed Ahmed (Arabic: محمد احمد) (born 1998) is an Egyptian footballer who plays for the Egyptian Premier League side Zamalek SC as a defender known as Camacho.

Honours

Zamalek SC
 Saudi-Egyptian Super Cup: 2018
 CAF Confederation Cup : 2018–19

References

External links

Bio at Mundial

Living people
1998 births
Egyptian footballers
Association football defenders
Egyptian Premier League players
Zamalek SC players